Lancaster Royal Grammar School (LRGS) is a selective grammar school (day and boarding) for boys aged 11–18 in Lancaster, Lancashire, England. Old students belong to The Old Lancastrians. The school's sixth form opened to girls in 2019. LRGS is also in the United Kingdom's thirty oldest schools.

History 
The school was founded between 1235 and 1256, probably nearer to the former, and was later endowed as a free school by John Gardyner.
The first definite mention of the old grammar school is found in a deed dated 4 August 1469, when the Abbess of Syon granted to John Gardyner, of Bailrigg (near Lancaster), a lease of a water-mill on the River Lune and some land nearby for two hundred years to maintain a chaplain to celebrate worship in the Church of St. Mary, Lancaster, and to instruct boys in grammar freely, "unless perchance something shall be voluntarily offered by their friends".

In 1472, John Gardyner's will made further provisions for the endowment of the school, and also for William Baxstonden to keep the school so long as he could teach the students. In 1682, the school was rebuilt and in 1852 was removed from the old site on the slopes by the priory to the outskirts of the city, where it now stands (though the city has expanded beyond it).

This building (now known as Old School House), which stands on the north side of East Road, was designed by the local architects Sharpe and Paley at a cost of £8,000. The foundation stone was laid on 5 May 1851 by James Prince Lee, the Bishop of Manchester. The title "Royal" was granted by Queen Victoria in the same year. This building is recorded in the National Heritage List for England as a designated Grade II listed building.

In 1969, the school celebrated its quincentenary and was visited by Elizabeth II. In 1995, the school received a visit from the Chancellor of the Duchy of Lancaster, Roger Freeman.

In 2001, to mark the 150th anniversary of becoming the Royal Grammar School, the school welcomed Anne, Princess Royal. In 2011, the school was granted academy status. On 6 November 2017, the school stated that they will be accepting sixth form girls from September 2019.

Headmasters 

Dates are of taking office.

Academic 

The school is regularly one of the strongest state schools both regionally and nationally. In 2022, students achieved top A and A* grades in 62.9% the A level exams that they sat. Over 75% of all results were graded A*, A or B.

The 2007 Ofsted report stated that "this is an outstanding school that provides very good value for money. The overwhelming majority of parents value greatly the school and its impact on their children."

In 2021, the school was inspected by Ofsted for the first time in 15 years, they found the school had “outstanding”: Behaviour and Attitudes, Personal development, Sixth Form, and Boarding provisions; as well as “good”: quality of education, and leadership and management; with  an overall rating of “good”. The downgrade from “outstanding” sparked controversy in the local and national community, and was received as part of a wider wave of downgrades in the inspection status of some of the UK’s top Grammar Schools after the inspection exemption for “outstanding” schools was removed.

In 2022 at GCSE 63.2% of all grades were 9-7, with nearly all pupils gaining 10 passes. In 2022 the grades 9-5 in English and Mathematics was 98%, 1% above its counterpart Lancaster Girls' Grammar School.

Boarding 

LRGS is a state boarding school with four boarding houses (Storey, Frankland, Ashton and School Houses) and 170 boarders. 

There are two senior boarding houses (Y10-U6), School and Ashton (School being the largest and oldest of the houses overall). School House consists of approx 60 boys living in New School House (formerly Gardyner House) and approx 20 girls in Frankland House (which serves as a sub-boarding house/annexe to School house). School House is led by a Senior Housemaster, Assistant Housemaster (School House), Assistant Housemistress (Frankland House), 2 matrons for each physical house, as well as a number of resident and duty tutors.

Frankland House is a sub-boarding house/annexe administered as part of School House. The house consists of approx 20 girls in a single building on the lower site of the school, with an Assistant Housemistress resident, and 2 matrons during the day, sharing tutors with School House.

Ashton House acts as the other senior boarding house with approx 50 boys living in 2 houses, Ashton House and Ashton Annexe (both located on the upper site of the school). The house is run by a Senior Housemaster, Assistant Housemaster, 3 matrons and resident/duty tutors.

Storey House is the principal junior boarding house (Y7-Y9) with approx 40 boys. The house has a Senior Housemaster, Assistant Housemaster, 3 matrons and 7 resident/duty tutors. Boys decide at the end of Year 9 which senior house they wish to move to, transfers to the other senior house are unusual after the start of Year 10, although can occur in exceptional circumstances.

Boarding is run by an Assistant Headmaster (Assistant Head for Boarding and Co-curricular). On each weekday, in each boarding house, there is a tutor and matron on duty as well as other resident staff, including resident tutors and Sports Graduates/Coaches, who each participate in house duties.

Each senior house (and annexe) operates a prefect system, consisting of: Head of House, Deputy Head(s) of House, Heads of Years, and other specific house life prefect roles. These systems are independent of the day school prefecture, and boarding prefects are directly responsible to their Housemaster, however many boarding prefects also have day school prefect roles. Although prefects do have sanctioning/soft disciplinary powers, it is at the discretion of the individual housemaster to form and maintain a conduct system and decide the roles prefects play.

The majority of boarders come from the northwest of England; others come from across the UK and overseas. Ofsted inspectors found boarding to be Outstanding in all categories in 2013.

Sport 
The school offers a wide range of sporting activities to the students throughout their school careers including tennis, sailing, swimming, rowing, cross country running etc. but remains a bastion of rugby union. Achievement in this code is generally accorded more prominence in school life than other activities but the school has achieved more notable success in rowing and cross country running, especially when their far lower budgets are taken into account. Nonetheless, the school has produced some notable figures in rugby union such as the former England and Bath coach Brian Ashton, former captain of Norway Erik Lund and his brother the England international Magnus Lund.

Former pupils have achieved Olympic success. Jason Queally, took track cycling gold in the 1 km time trial at the 2000 Summer Olympics and Scott Durant won gold with the British Men's Eight in the 2016 Summer Olympics (see Boat Club).

In 2011, the LRGS lst XI won the Local Football Cup, beating Morecambe High School 1–0 at the Globe Arena.

In 2014, the LRGS 1st XI cricket team became the first in the school’s history to win the RGS Festival. The trophy was contested in Newcastle over a week of fixtures, and LRGS finished without losing a game in the tournament.

In 2015 the U13s won the Lancashire Cup Final against Audenshaw 20–5.

In 2012, the LRGS 1st XV reached the last 8 of the Rosslyn Park National 7s tournament and the U16s reached the last 32.

In 2010, the 1st XV, won the Lancashire Cup Final, and became champions in a match against Merchant Taylor's Crosby. This achievement was followed by the U14s and the U15s who were victorious in finals against Merchant Taylor's Crosby and Manchester Grammar School, respectively.

In 2009, the U13s and U14s reached the finals of the Lancashire Cup, however both lost narrowly against Manchester Grammar School. In the 2008/2009 season, LRGS won the Lancashire schools cup in the U18s and the U13s as well as winning the Floodlit cup for Lancashire and Cheshire in the U16s. They also set a new record with four teams reaching the county finals. While, in 2007/2008 season, LRGS won the Lancashire Cup in the U15 and U16 age groups.

In recent years the school has enjoyed an improved reputation in cricket with recent highlights including the school's 1st XI Cricket team's narrow defeat in the Sir Garfield Sobers Tournament at The Kensington Oval Barbados in July 2011. The school achieved a victory over Charterhouse School in the final of the Lord's Taverners Cricketer Colts Trophy for Schools in 1999, and enjoyed a run to the semi final of the Daily Mail U18 Cup in 2004.

In 2010, LRGS became the U19 and U16 district champions for table tennis.

Boat club 

Lancaster Royal Grammar School Boat Club was founded in 1948. They were tenants of Lancaster John O' Gaunt Rowing Club from 1985 to 2011. In 2011 the Boat Club relocated to Halton Army Training Camp.

The boat club had 15 years of national success under Tim Lucas achieving medal success in either the Schools' Head of the River Race, The National Schools Regatta or the National Rowing Championships for ten consecutive years from 1992 to 2002. The club also made at least the final of a national event from 1992 to 2006. The club has had much international success with members of the boat club rowing at a national level, including the Munich International Regatta in 2006 and the Coupe de la Jeunesse in 2006. His successor Peter Jago coached OL Scott Durant who was member of the Great Britain Eight that won gold in the 2016 Olympic Summer Games. Scott started rowing at Lancaster Royal Grammar School aged 15 with his twin brother Mason.

In 2015, Storm Desmond devastated the boathouse, destroying many boats from the fleet. However, the club has since obtained a new fleet of Kanghua boats and a larger boathouse.

Cross country club

Although the school's main sports during the summer and winter are cricket and rugby respectively, in recent years, it is the school's cross country squad that has achieved the most recognition nationally. The school's rise to prominence began in the late 2000s, with several LRGS athletes being chosen to represent Lancashire at the English Schools’ Cross Country. In 2009 the school had 6 County runners. In 2010 LRGS won the Northern School Cross Country Championships for the first time, and repeated this feat in 2011 and 2012. The school also won the Stonyhurst Invitation Race in 2011 and 2012, recorded a 5th-place finish in the National Schools Cross Country Relays in 2011, and a 3rd-place finish in the Intermediate Boys English Schools Cross Country Cup in the same year. The club have been the National Schools Senior Fell Running Champions from 2011, with several National medalists.

Combined Cadet Force 

The Combined Cadet Force (CCF) at LRGS comprises Royal Navy, Army and Royal Air Force sections. Pupils in year nine and above are allowed to join. It parades on Tuesday afternoons after school and is voluntary. All sections participate in camps throughout the year, including an annual summer camp during the summer holidays, and an Easter camp involving adventurous training in which all three sections can participate. The Contingent, as of 2019 maintains around 200 members, and is led by a Cadet RSM, which can be drawn from any section (though typically of the Army).

The school has had its own CCF since 1914, then known as the Officer Training Corps. Its roots, however, can be traced back further still, as there are "references to the existence at Lancaster of a Cadet Volunteer Battalion in the early nineteenth century". and in 1861, the seventy-strong Battalion was presented with a silver bugle "by Mrs Lee, wife of the Headmaster".

The Royal Navy Section consists of around 35 cadets, including girls from Lancaster Girls' Grammar School, who have been participating since September 2012. The main activities offered are water-based, and the section often goes sailing on Marine Lake, Southport. Cadets in the Navy section also attend national camps and courses run by HQ CCF RN, on which cadets can gain nationally recognised qualifications in topics from power boating to first aid.

The Army Section is approximately 110 students strong. Since September 2019, girls have been able to join army section. They participate in camps throughout the year including an annual camp that lasts over a week, and an Easter Camp where they take part in adventurous training activities, a range day where the cadets fire the L98-A2 Cadet GP Rifle, a field day where the cadets deploy on Manoeuvers for 24hours equipped with blank rounds and a night navigation exercise named Operation Night Owl. Annual Camp 2007 was at a CCF Central Camp at Wathgill, in North Yorkshire. Annual camp 2016 was in Warcop, Cumbria, with annual camp 2017 held at Nesscliffe training camp, Shropshire, with cadets winning both the inter-force gun run, tug of war and arm wrestling competitions, overall emerging as the best cadet force on camp. Senior Cadets of the army section are eligible to participate in the Senior Cadet Instructor Course (SCIC) and the Master Cadet Course, where Senior Non-Commissioned Officers (SNCOs) demonstrate their leadership and technical skills both in the field and the classroom.

The Royal Air Force section is the second most popular section with about 85 cadets, who receive flying lessons in the Grob Tutor T.1 aircraft and gliding lessons in the Grob Vigilant G 109 glider. Opportunities for flying and gliding scholarships, as well as various leadership courses, are also available to the most dedicated and talented cadets. The RAF section recently qualified for the national AST competition and has had multiple cadets complete the ACLC course at RAF Cranwell. The most recent RAF Easter camp was held at RAF Halton, with the summer camp being held at RAF Valley. An inspection, known as the Bi-ennial inspection takes place every two years. In 2012 the inspection took place at Halton Training Camp. Former pupils have gone on to become commercial pilots. Due to Covid-19, the RAF section has had limited opportunities to fly and have not done so as a section since the pandemic. The RAF section is the first and only section of the Contingent to have been led a female cadet, Cadet Warrant Officer.

The Contingent holds an annual prize-giving parade, at which awards are given by the Contingent Commander, Section Commanders and distinguished guests to Cadets who have performed at the highest standards. Each section presents a senior and junior best cadet prize, to accompany the contingent wide awards, those being: Section commanders commendation and Commander’s Cup for outstanding leadership, The Halliwell Shield for the Most improved Cadet, and the Oglesby-Wellings Sword for the best section commander (awarded in memory of Giles Oglesby-Wellings, a former senior cadet, who passed away after a climbing accident in the Swiss Alps in 2002). The parade is also used to present promotions and skills badges to cadets for competencies and leadership.

All three sections of the CCF learn how to use the L98-A2 Cadet GP Rifle. Various shooting activities take place for all three sections and new recruits in the Army section are tested on the GP Rifle during Easter at Sealand Ranges

Notable former pupils 

Former pupils are known as "Old Lancastrians" and there are several branches of the club in the UK and worldwide. Notable Old Lancastrians include:
 Matthew Hutton, 16th century Archbishop of York, and Master of Pembroke College, Cambridge;
 Sir John Singleton, British High Court Judge and Conservative politician 
  Lord Parkinson, former Conservative Party Chairman and Cabinet Minister;
 Christopher Urswick (1448-1522), priest and confessor to Lady Margaret Beaufort and messenger between her and her son Henry VII of England, he has a speaking part in Shakespeare's Richard III (play)
 John Edward Marr, British geologist, Fellow of St John's College, Cambridge and lecturer of geology at the University of Cambridge 
 Don Foster, Baron Foster of Bath, Liberal Democrat MP for Bath from 1992–2015;
 Joe Abercrombie, fantasy novelist;
 Roger Ainsworth, Master of St Catherine's College, Oxford and professor of engineering science from 1998;
 Sir John Rutherford, 1st Baronet, Conservative MP for Darwen from 1895–1922;
 William Whewell, scientist, Master of Trinity College, Cambridge and reputed inventor of the word scientist
 Robert Ascroft, Conservative MP for Oldham from 1895–99;
 Sir Albert Seward, Master of Downing College, Cambridge;
 Brian Ashton, England rugby union team former head coach;
 Alexander Birtwistle, Army officer;
 Mervyn Brooker, English cricketer and headmaster;
 John Wrathall, President of Rhodesia;
 Phil Christophers, England rugby international;
 Sean Cox, plays for London Irish rugby union team;
 James Crosby, former chief executive of the HBOS Group and former deputy chairman of the FSA;
 Scott Durant, Olympic rower, gold medallist in the 2016 Summer Olympics;
 John Fleming, inventor of the vacuum tube and Fleming's left hand rule;
 Sir Edward Frankland (1825–1899), chemist; 
 Sir Ronald Halstead (1927–2021) – Chairman and Chief Executive of the Beecham Group from 1984 to 1985 and Deputy Chairman of British Steel from 1986 to 1994.
 Frederick Crossfield Happold, headmaster and army officer awarded DSO in 1916;  
 Lewis Henry Isaacs, architect, surveyor and Conservative MP for Walworth from 1885–92;
 Lauren Jeska, transgender fell runner convicted of the attempted murder of Ralph Knibbs
 Air Vice-Marshal George Lamb, station commander of RAF Lyneham from 1969–71;
 Commander Brian C. Longbottom, RN. Youngest RN Captain in WWII, and senior NATO official;
 Magnus Lund, England rugby international;
 Erik Lund, Norwegian rugby international captain;
 Jason McCartney, Conservative MP for Colne Valley from 2010–17, and again from 2019;
 Nigel Morris, co-founder and former COO of Capital One;
 Sir Richard Owen, naturalist;
 Karl Oyston, English businessman and former chairman of Blackpool Football Club;
 Hugh Pennington, biologist, head of the 1996 Pennington Enquiry, professor of bacteriology at the University of Aberdeen from 1979–2003;
 Colin Povey, chief executive of Warwickshire County Cricket Club and former chief executive of Carlsberg;
 Jason Queally, gold medal-winning cyclist at the 2000 Summer Olympics;
 Sir Peter Ratcliffe, Nobel Prize winner for medicine 2019, Nuffield Professor of Clinical Medicine at the University of Oxford since 2004;
 Jon Richardson, stand-up comedian and comedy writer, 2009 Edinburgh Comedy Award nominee, panel shows including 8 Out of 10 Cats;
 Kevin Roberts, former CEO worldwide Saatchi & Saatchi;
 David Roy Shackleton Bailey, Latin scholar;
 Bob Shennan, BBC radio executive and controller of BBC Radio 2;
 William Swainson (1809-1884), second Attorney General of New Zealand; 
 Paul Swarbrick (born 1958), Roman Catholic bishop
 Paul Wellings, vice-chancellor of the University of Wollongong 
 Gavin Wood, co-founder and former CTO of Ethereum;
 Robert Samuel Woof, first director of the Wordsworth Trust;
 John Woolrich, composer, professor of music, Brunel University;
 Frank Wrathall, racing driver in the BTCC.

See also

Listed buildings in Lancaster, Lancashire

References 

Boys' schools in Lancashire
Educational institutions established in the 13th century
Schools in Lancaster, Lancashire
People educated at Lancaster Royal Grammar School
Boarding schools in Lancashire
Grammar schools in Lancashire
13th-century establishments in England
Sharpe and Paley buildings
Grade II listed buildings in Lancashire
Academies in Lancashire